Civic Memorial High School is a public high school in Bethalto, Illinois that is part of the Bethalto Community Unit School District 8. It serves students from Bethalto, Meadowbrook, Cottage Hills, and parts of Rosewood Heights and Moro.

The school was originally named Bethalto High School. The name was changed to Civic Memorial High School when the new building was completed in the 1950s.

The first graduating class was that of 1951. Prior to that, students attended classes through their junior year, then graduated from either Wood River High School or Roxana High School. The original Civic Memorial High School building at 910 Second St. (the current Wilbur Trimpe Middle School) housed a three-year high school (grades 10–12) until the 1974–75 school year, when school added 9th grade. Civic Memorial moved into its present building at 200 School Street for the 1979–1980 school year.

References

External links
Civic Memorial High School
Bethalto Community Unit School District 8
CM Statistics

Public high schools in Illinois
Schools in Madison County, Illinois
1951 establishments in Illinois